Events in the year 2004 in Eritrea.

Incumbents 

 President: Isaias Afewerki

Events 

 12 March – United Nations Security Council resolution 1531 was adopted unanimously and extended the mandate of the United Nations Mission in Ethiopia and Eritrea (UNMEE) until 15 September 2004.

Deaths

References 

 
2000s in Eritrea
Years of the 21st century in Eritrea
Eritrea
Eritrea